Akrahreppur (regionally also ) is a former municipality situated in the Northwestern Region of Iceland. It is divided into a range of villages, including Ábær. In February 2022, residents of Akrahreppur and the neighboring municipality of Skagafjörður voted to combine the two municipalities into a single municipality. In June 2022 the merger was formalized under the name of Skagafjörður.

Localities
 Ábær
 Miklibær
 Silfrastaðir

References

Former municipalities of Iceland
Northwestern Region (Iceland)
States and territories disestablished in 2022